Shiloh Nelson (born January 22, 2009) is an American actress, TikToker, and YouTuber, mostly known for starring on the YouTube channel Shiloh & Bros. Nelson is also known for playing young Casey Newton in Tomorrowland, Keia in Puppy Dog Pals, and Ruby in Feel the Beat, as well as starring in the films Moms' Night Out and Adopting Terror.

Filmography

Film

Television

References

External links

2009 births
21st-century American actresses
Actresses from Berkeley, California
People from Berkeley, California
American child actresses
American film actresses
American television actresses
American voice actresses
American YouTubers(Shiloh and bros)
Living people